Saint-Nazaire-de-Ladarez  is a commune in the Hérault department in the Occitanie region in southern France.

Population

Personalities related to the commune 
 Madeleine Laissac was mayor of the commune from 1947 to 1971.

See also
Communes of the Hérault department

References

Communes of Hérault